The 1975–76 Rutgers Scarlet Knights men's basketball represented Rutgers University in the 1975–76 NCAA Division I men's basketball season. The head coach was Tom Young, then in his third season with the Scarlet Knights. The team played its home games in College Avenue Gymnasium in New Brunswick, New Jersey, and was an NCAA Division I Independent. The Scarlet Knights played an exciting, up-tempo brand of basketball, averaging a school-record 93.3 points per game. They entered the NCAA tournament with a perfect record (28–0), and would defeat Princeton, Connecticut, and VMI to reach the only Final Four in school history. After 31 consecutive wins, Rutgers fell to Michigan, 86–70, in the national semifinals, then to UCLA, 106–92, in the consolation game.

Roster

Schedule and results

|-
!colspan=9 style=| Regular season

|-
!colspan=9 style=| ECAC Metro Tournament

|-
!colspan=9 style=| NCAA Tournament

Rankings

Team players drafted into the NBA

References 

Rutgers Scarlet Knights men's basketball seasons
Rutgers
Rutgers
NCAA Division I men's basketball tournament Final Four seasons
1975 in sports in New Jersey
1976 in sports in New Jersey